The Embassy of Cuba in Moscow is the diplomatic mission of Cuba in the Russian Federation. It is located at 66 Bolshaya Ordynka Street in the Yakimanka District of Moscow.

See also 
 Cuba–Russia relations
 Diplomatic missions in Russia

References

External links 
  Embassy of Cuba in Russia
  Embassy of Cuba in Russia - new website

Cuba–Russia relations
Cuba–Soviet Union relations
Cuba
Moscow